Small Town Saturday Night is a 2010 American ensemble drama film by writer-director Ryan Craig. The film stars Chris Pine, Shawn Christian, John Hawkes and Bre Blair. The film also features actors Muse Watson, Robert Pine, Brent Briscoe, Scott Michael Campbell, Adam Hendershott, Octavia Spencer, Kali Majors and Lin Shaye.

Plot

The subtle connections of a deputy sheriff, a Nashville-bound singer, an ex-con, and a single mother will intertwine in this tale of small-town life. Tommy Carson (Shawn Christian) works around the clock to keep the peace in Prospect, but Donny (John Hawkes), who is on a downward spiral, makes this even more difficult for the deputy Sheriff. Rhett Ryan (Chris Pine) discovers that the desire to follow his dream conflicts with his desire to be with the woman he loves. While Samantha (Bre Blair) does love the singer-songwriter, she comes to realize that what's best for her daughter (Kali Majors) and their future may not be what's best for him. Les (Adam Hendershott) just wants to fit in with his big brother's friends, but his overbearing mother (Lin Shaye) desperately wants him to stand out.

Cast
 Chris Pine as Rhett Ryan
 Shawn Christian as Tommy Carson
 John Hawkes as Donny
 Bre Blair as Samantha Carson
 Octavia Spencer as Rhonda Dooley
 Muse Watson as Charlie
 Robert Pine as John Ryan
 Brent Briscoe as Travis Perkins
 Scott Michael Campbell as Dwayne Murphy
 Adam Hendershott as Les Ryan
 Kali Majors as Megan Carson
 Lin Shaye as Phyllis Ryan
 Gerald Darnell as Jerry The Truck Driver
 Martin Corcoran as Chance

Production
Shot on location in the San Bernardino mountain villages of Crestline, Valley of Enchantment, Twin Peaks, Blue Jay, Lake Arrowhead and Running Springs, California, Craig wanted the setting to be a character unto itself. He also wanted the town to look and feel like Anywhere, USA. The film's opening sequence was shot in Oregon to pay homage to the director's hometown.

Release
The film premiered at the American Film Market in November 2009. It was later shopped around at the European Film Market in February 2010, as well as a May 18, 2010 screening at the Cannes Film Market.

The film was set for a U.S. DVD release date of June 1, 2010 by Lionsgate.

Musical Score by Steve Bertrand

Soundtrack
 "Heartbreakin' Wreck" - The Boxmasters
 "Good Day To Go Crazy" - Wade Hayes
 "Life Ain't Long Enough" - Ray Scott
 "Country Boyz" - Phil Vassar
 "Never Too Late" - Sheri Short
 "It Happens" - Rachael Thibodeau
 "And Then I Did" - Jeffrey Steele
 "Cool Became Me" - The Warren Brothers
 "Novocaine" - Little Big Town
 "We Rode in Trucks" - Luke Bryan
 "Small Town Big Time" - Chris Young
 "Hollow Walls" - The Boxmasters
 "Good Way To Go" - Jonathan Singleton
 "A Girl Like You" - Curtis Lance
 "Someday Came Today" - Chris Pine
 "Population Sign" - Wade Hayes

References

External links
 
 
 

2010 films
American drama films
2010s English-language films
2010s American films